Arco de São Jorge is a civil parish in the municipality of Santana, the Portuguese island of Madeira. The population in 2011 was 413, in an area of 3.38 km²; it is the smallest parish of the municipality by population and area.

Geography

Arco de São Jorge is located near the north coast of the island, in the northwest of the municipality of Santana.

References

Freguesias of Santana, Madeira